The  (abbrev. INA), is a repository of all French radio and television audiovisual archives. Additionally it provides free access to archives of countries such as Afghanistan and Cambodia. It has its headquarters in Bry-sur-Marne.

Since 2006, it has allowed free online consultation on a website called ina.fr with a search tool indexing 100,000 archives of historical programs, for a total of 20,000 hours.

Recordings
In the 1980s, it issued a large number of recordings on the label France's Concert Records. In the 1990s it launched its own label INA mémoire  as the historical recording label of the Institut national de l'audiovisuel, and of the archives of Radio France.

History

The  was founded in 1975 by a law of 1974 with the purpose of  conserving archives of audiovisual materials, research relating to them and professional training. In 1992, legal deposit was extended to television and radio, and the institute was to be the depository. In 2002, legal deposit was extended to cable and satellite television and in 2005 to terrestrial digital television. From September 2006, the institute has been responsible for archiving 17 radio and 45 television services amounting to 300,000 hours per year.

Presidents

See also

Groupe de Recherches Musicales
François Bayle

References

External links

INA Official website - English-language link
Institut national de l'audiovisuel 
Official INA Arditube channel on YouTube
Official INA Chansons channel on YouTube
French radio and television archives on line (French)
Tales of a festival : remembering Cannes in sound and picture (English and French version)
Europe of cultures 50 years of artistic creation and cultural life from the 27 countries of the European Union (English and French version)
L’Institut national de l’audiovisuel: Free Content and Rights Licensing as Complementary Strategies (English) A case study on the INA business model by Ithaka for the Strategic Content Alliance

Film archives in France
Sound archives
IFPI members
Television in France
Mass media in Paris
Organizations with year of establishment missing